Legislative elections were held in New Caledonia on 22 December 1946 and 5 January 1947 to elect the 19 elected members of the General Council.

The elections saw the left-wing members elected in 1945 largely replaced by members representing business and the mining industry.

The new Council elected Henri Lafleur as the territory's representative to the French Council of the Republic.

Elected members
The 19 elected members were:
Henri Bonneaud
Bourgarde
Bussy
Cuer
David
Duplat
Féré
Legrand
Legras
Loucheron
Mary
Mariotti
Henri Lafleur
Pannetier
Parazols
de Saint Quentin
Robert
Talon
Varin

References

New Caledonia
1947 in New Caledonia
1947 in France
New Caledonia
1946 in New Caledonia
Elections in New Caledonia